Stefan Klockare (born May 30, 1972) is a Swedish former professional ice hockey defenceman. He is currently a coach with Skellefteå AIK of the Swedish Hockey League.

References

External links

1972 births
Living people
Brynäs IF players
Swedish ice hockey coaches
Swedish ice hockey defencemen
Timrå IK players